Khaled Khamis (Arabic:خالد خميس) (born 14 September 1994) is an Emirati footballer. He currently plays as a midfielder for Emirates Club.

External links

References

Emirati footballers
1994 births
Living people
Ras Al Khaimah Club players
Emirates Club players
UAE First Division League players
UAE Pro League players
Association football midfielders